Vladimir Afromeev is a businessman and Chess player who was born in 1954 in the city of Magadan. In the mid-2000s Afromeev gained spectacular, apparently miraculous, improvements in his official FIDE Elo rating, leaving him at a rating of 2646 (67th in the world) and the Fide Master (FM) title on 1 October 2007.

Controversy
Many top players in the chess world, including GM Alexander Baburin, feel that Afromeev's rise to the world's elite in middle age is a little too spectacular. They consider his rating achievement as a "fraud" and termed Afromeev's rise to the top an "abuse" of FIDE's rating system. In an article for 
Chess Today, (issue CT-2457) Baburin complains that it is completely unheard of and almost ludicrous to think that someone could suddenly reach the elite chessplayers in the world in middle age. He points to the fact that Afromeev himself organised many of the tournaments he appears in. On the other hand, it is not unusual for players to organise tournaments they appear in. Afromeev has successfully sued IM Igor Yagupov, who comes from the same birthplace, for defamation in 64 No.7 of 2001 and easily won the case by presenting the scorecards, game reports, hotel receipts etc. According to Baburin, Afromeev's (recently unrated) driver now has an Elo rating of over 2440 and (again according to Baburin), he once stated that if he wanted, his cat would have a similar rating. Such things have not helped Afromeev's credibility as a world class chess player.

References
The Week in Chess (Number 660, 2 July 2007) has some comments on Afromeev's rating.
Issue CT-300 of Chess today. (from 2001)

External links 

Russian chess players
Chess FIDE Masters
Living people
1954 births